Dickinson House may refer to:

in the United States (by state then city)
Dickinson House (Grove Hill, Alabama), listed on the National Register of Historic Places (NRHP) in Clarke County, Alabama
Dickinson-Moore House, Arkansas City, Arkansas, listed on the NRHP in Desha County
Edward Dickinson House, Batesville, Arkansas, listed on the NRHP in Independence County
John Dickinson House, Dover, Delaware, a U.S. National Historic Landmark and NRHP-listed in Kent County
Emily Dickinson House, Amherst, Massachusetts, a U.S. National Historic Landmark and NRHP-listed in Hampshire County
Dickinson-Pillsbury-Witham House, Georgetown, Massachusetts, listed on the NRHP in Essex County
Dickinson House (Alloway, New Jersey), listed on the NRHP in Salem County
Gen. Philemon Dickinson House, Trenton, New Jersey, listed on the NRHP in Mercer County
Dickinson Estate Historic District, Brattleboro, Vermont, listed on the NRHP in Windham County
Dickinson-Milbourn House, Jonesville, Virginia, listed on the NRHP in Lee County
Decatur and Kate Dickinson House, Neillsville, Wisconsin, listed on the NRHP in Clark County